Alexander Vladimirovich Yakubovsky (born 7 May 1985, Irkutsk) is a Russian political figure and a deputy of the 7th and 8th State Dumas.
 
From 2009 to 2011, Yakubovsky worked as Deputy General Director for Prospective Development of the Irkutskpromstroy. In 2009 he was appointed Managing Director of LLC "MonolithHolding" in Krasnoyarsk. From 2015 to 2018, he was the Commercial Director of the Baykalo-Amurskaya stroitel'naya kompaniya LLC. He started his political career in 2007 when he joined the United Russia. In 2008–2011, he was the Deputy Chief of the Regional Headquarters of the Young Guard of United Russia. From 2014 to 2018, he served as deputy of the Irkutsk City Duma of the 6th convocation. In 2016, he became a member of the regional branch of the All-Russia People's Front. On September 9, 2018, he was elected deputy of the Legislative Assembly of Irkutsk Oblast of the 3rd convocation. He left the post to become deputy of the 7th State Duma after the passing of Joseph Kobzon. Since September 2021, he has served as deputy of the 8th State Duma.

References
 

 

1985 births
Living people
United Russia politicians
21st-century Russian politicians
Eighth convocation members of the State Duma (Russian Federation)
Seventh convocation members of the State Duma (Russian Federation)
Politicians from Irkutsk